Latvia participated in the Eurovision Song Contest 2008 with the song "Wolves of the Sea" written by Jonas Liberg, Torbjörn Wassenius, Johan Sahlen and Claes Andreasson. The song was performed by the group Pirates of the Sea. The Latvian broadcaster Latvijas Televīzija (LTV) organised the national final Eirodziesma 2008 in order to select the Latvian entry for the 2008 contest in Belgrade, Serbia. Twenty songs were selected to compete in the national final, which consisted of three shows: two semi-finals and a final. In the semi-finals on 2 and 9 February 2008, five entries were selected to advance from each show: three entries selected based on a public televote and two entries selected by an eight-member jury panel. Ten songs ultimately qualified to compete in the final on 1 March 2008 where two rounds of public voting selected "Wolves of the Sea" performed by Pirates of the Sea as the winner.

Latvia was drawn to compete in the second semi-final of the Eurovision Song Contest which took place on 22 May 2008. Performing during the show in position 10, "Wolves of the Sea" was announced among the 10 qualifying entries of the second semi-final and therefore qualified to compete in the final on 24 May. It was later revealed that Latvia placed sixth out of the 19 participating countries in the semi-final with 86 points. In the final, Latvia performed in position 14 and placed twelfth out of the 25 participating countries, scoring 83 points.

Background 

Prior to the 2008 contest, Latvia had participated in the Eurovision Song Contest eight times since its first entry in 2000. Latvia won the contest once in 2002 with the song "I Wanna" performed by Marie N. Following the introduction of semi-finals for the 2004, Latvia was able to qualify to compete in the final between 2005 and 2007 including with their 2007 entry "Questa notte" performed by Bonaparti.lv.

The Latvian national broadcaster, Latvijas Televīzija (LTV), broadcasts the event within Latvia and organises the selection process for the nation's entry. LTV confirmed their intentions to participate at the 2008 Eurovision Song Contest on 23 May 2007. Latvia has selected their entries for the Eurovision Song Contest through a national final. Since their debut in 2000, LTV had organised the selection show Eirodziesma. On 2 October 2007, the broadcaster announced that they would organise Eirodziesma 2008 in order to select the Latvian entry for the 2008 contest.

Before Eurovision

Eirodziesma 2008 
Eirodziesma 2008 was the ninth edition of Eirodziesma, the music competition that selects Latvia's entries for the Eurovision Song Contest. The competition commenced on 2 February 2008 and concluded with a final on 1 March 2008. All shows in the competition were hosted by Uģis Joksts and Kristīne Virsnīte and broadcast on LTV1 as well as online via the website apollo.lv.

Format 
The format of the competition consisted of three shows: two semi-finals and a final. The two semi-finals, held on 2 and 9 February 2008, each featured ten competing entries from which five advanced to the final from each show. The final, held on 1 March 2008, selected the Latvian entry for Belgrade from the remaining ten entries over two rounds of voting: the first round selected the top three songs and the second round (superfinal) selected the winner. Results during the semi-final shows were determined by a jury panel and votes from the public. The songs first faced a public vote where the top three entries qualified. The jury then selected an additional two qualifiers from the remaining entries to proceed in the competition. In the final, a public vote exclusively determined which entry would be the winner. Viewers were able to vote via telephone or SMS.

Competing entries 
Artists and songwriters were able to submit their entries to the broadcaster between 2 October 2007 and 19 November 2007. 88 entries were submitted at the conclusion of the submission period. A jury panel appointed by LTV evaluated the submitted songs and selected twenty entries for the competition. The jury panel consisted of Sopho Khalvashi (2007 Georgian Eurovision entrant), 4Fun (2007 Lithuanian Eurovision entrant), Christer Björkman (Head of Delegation for Sweden at the Eurovision Song Contest and supervisor of Melodifestivalen), Adam Klein (British music manager), Bonaparti.lv (2007 Latvian Eurovision entrant) and Kaspars Zavileiskis (music expert and editor at FHM). The twenty competing artists and songs were announced during a press conference on 11 December 2007. Among the artists were Andris Ērglis and Roberto Meloni (member of Pirates of the Sea) who both represented Latvia in the Eurovision Song Contest 2007 as part of Bonaparti.lv. It was later revealed that "Wolves of the Sea" had originally been written in Swedish for the 2007 edition of Melodifestivalen, titled "Här mellan himmel och jord" and to be performed by the group Drängarna; however the song was subsequently translated to English for Eirodziesma after being rejected from the former competition.

Shows

Semi-finals 
The two semi-finals took place on 2 and 9 February 2008. The live portion of the show was held at the LTV studios in Riga where the artists awaited the results while their performances, which were filmed earlier at the Club Essential in Riga on 21 and 23 January 2008, were screened. In each semi-final ten acts competed and five entries qualified to the final. The competing entries first faced a public vote where the top three songs advanced; an additional two qualifiers were then selected from the remaining seven entries by the jury. The jury panel that voted in the semi-finals consisted of Ance Krauze (singer and vocal teacher), Intars Busulis (singer, trombonist and radio host), Māris Žigats (musician and DJ at Radio SWH), Aivars Hermanis (composer, arranger and producer), Gatis Gaujenieks (producer), Daina Markova (musicologist and content editor at LTV), Ilze Vītoliņa (costume designer) and members of the LTV working group.

Final
The final took place at the Olympic Center in Ventspils on 1 March 2008. The ten entries that qualified from the preceding two semi-finals competed and the winner was selected over two rounds of public televoting. In the first round, the top three songs advanced to the second round, the superfinal. In the superfinal, "Wolves of the Sea" performed by Pirates of the Sea was declared the winner. In addition to the performances of the competing entries, guest performers included 2007 Latvian Eurovision entrant Bonaparti.lv, 2008 Azerbaijani Eurovision entrant Elnur and Samir, 2008 Czech Eurovision entrant Tereza Kerndlová, 2008 Lithuanian Eurovision entrant Jeronimas Milius and 2008 Maltese Eurovision entrant Morena.

At Eurovision 
It was announced in September 2007 that the competition's format would be expanded to two semi-finals in 2008. According to Eurovision rules, all nations with the exceptions of the host country and the "Big Four" (France, Germany, Spain and the United Kingdom) are required to qualify from one of two semi-finals in order to compete for the final; the top nine songs from each semi-final as determined by televoting progress to the final, and a tenth was determined by back-up juries. The European Broadcasting Union (EBU) split up the competing countries into six different pots based on voting patterns from previous contests, with countries with favourable voting histories put into the same pot. On 28 January 2008, a special allocation draw was held which placed each country into one of the two semi-finals. Latvia was placed into the second semi-final, to be held on 22 May 2008. The running order for the semi-finals was decided through another draw on 17 March 2008 and Latvia was set to perform in position 10, following the entry from Belarus and before the entry from Croatia.

The two semi-finals and the final were broadcast in Latvia on LTV1 with all shows featuring commentary by Kārlis Streips. The Latvian spokesperson, who announced the Latvian votes during the final, was Kristīne Virsnīte.

Semi-final 

Pirates of the Sea took part in technical rehearsals on 14 and 17 May, followed by dress rehearsals on 21 and 22 May. The Latvian performance featured the members of Pirates of the Sea wearing pirate outfits and joined on stage by three backing vocalists. Several props were used for the performance which included antique weapons and swords, skull and cross bones flags, a telescope that created a small display effect showing what was seen on the top right side of the screen when used by one of the performers, and a ship steering wheel. The LED screens displayed large sharks swimming around. The backing vocalists that joined Pirates of the Sea were: Liene Candy, Oskars Zaļkalniņš and Zane Biķe-Slišāne.

At the end of the show, Latvia was announced as having finished in the top 10 and subsequently qualifying for the grand final. It was later revealed that Latvia placed sixth in the semi-final, receiving a total of 86 points.

Final 
Shortly after the second semi-final, a winners' press conference was held for the ten qualifying countries. As part of this press conference, the qualifying artists took part in a draw to determine the running order of the final. This draw was done in the order the countries appeared in the semi-final running order. Latvia was drawn to perform in position 14, following the entry from Portugal and before the entry from Sweden.

Pirates of the Sea once again took part in dress rehearsals on 23 and 24 May before the final. The group performed a repeat of their semi-final performance during the final on 24 May. At the conclusion of the voting, Latvia finished in twelfth place with 83 points.

Voting 
Below is a breakdown of points awarded to Latvia and awarded by Latvia in the second semi-final and grand final of the contest. The nation awarded its 12 points to Lithuania in the semi-final and to Russia in the final of the contest.

Points awarded to Latvia

Points awarded by Latvia

After Eurovision
Following the contest, "Wolves of the Sea" went on to have minor success in European music charts, peaking at number 40 in Denmark's Hitlisten. The song was subsequently covered by Scottish folk metal band Alestorm and included on their 2009 album Black Sails at Midnight, and in Afrikaans by South African singer Willem Botha as "Hi Hi Ho", which has also been used as a chant by fans of the South Africa national rugby union team, the Springboks, during team matches.

References

2008
Countries in the Eurovision Song Contest 2008
Eurovision